Acacia bakeri, known as the marblewood, white marblewood, Baker's wattle or scrub wattle, is one of the largest of all acacias, growing to  tall. It is a long-lived climax rainforest tree from eastern Australia. Unlike most acacias, fire is not required for seed germination. This tree is considered vulnerable to extinction. Its former habitat is lowland sub tropical rainforest which has been mostly cleared in the 19th and 20th centuries.

Description
The grey to greyish brown coloured bark is finely fissured or sometimes smooth. It has reddish coloured, terete and glabrous branchlets. Like most Acacias it has phyllodes rather than true leaves. It usually flowers in the spring and produces inflorescences that appear singly on the raceme axis. The firmly papery to thinly leathery seed pods that form after flowering are straight or curved and flat but can be constricted between the seeds.

Taxonomy
The species was first formally described by the botanist Joseph Maiden in 1896 as part of the work A giant Acacia from the Brunswick River as published in the Proceedings of the Linnean Society of New South Wales. It was reclassified as Racosperma bakeri by Leslie Pedley in 1987 the transferred back to genus Acacia in 2001.
The specific epithet honours Richard Thomas Baker who worked for the Sydney Technological Museum and collected the type specimen.
It is thought to be allied with Acacia binervata and part of a group of species closely related Acacia rothii.

Distribution
The natural range of distribution is from Brunswick Heads and Mullumbimby in north eastern New South Wales to around the Burrum River in the Maryborough of south eastern Queensland where it is commonly a part of wet sclerophyll Eucalyptus forest and rainforest communities. It grows usually in lowland areas with volcanic and alluvial soils.

See also
 List of Acacia species

References

  (other publication details, included in citation)

bakeri
Fabales of Australia
Trees of Australia
Vulnerable flora of Australia
Flora of New South Wales
Flora of Queensland
Vulnerable biota of Queensland
Plants described in 1896
Taxa named by Joseph Maiden